The Gorno–Altai Regional Committee of the Communist Party of the Soviet Union, commonly referred to as the Gorno–Altai CPSU obkom, was the position of highest authority in the Oyrot AO (1922–1948), Gorno-Altai AO (1948–1990), Gorno-Altai ASSR (1990–1991) and the Gorno-Altai SSR (1990–1991) in the Russian SFSR of the Soviet Union. The position was created on June 1, 1922, and abolished on August 23, 1991. The First Secretary was a de facto appointed position usually by the Politburo or the General Secretary himself.

List of First Secretaries of the Gorno–Altai Communist Party

Notes

See also
Gorno-Altai Autonomous Oblast
Gorno-Altai Autonomous Soviet Socialist Republic

Sources
 World Statesmen.org

1922 establishments in the Soviet Union
1991 disestablishments in the Soviet Union
Gorno–Altai
Politics of the Altai Republic